Eurelia is a town and locality in the Australian state of South Australia. 

Eurelia may also refer to the following: 
Hundred of Eurelia, a cadastral unit in South Australia
District Council of Eurelia, former local government in South Australia
SS Eurelia, a ship - refer Walsh Island Dockyard and Engineering Works